The 2001–02 SM-liiga season was the 27th season of the SM-liiga, the top level of ice hockey in Finland. 13 teams participated in the league, and Jokerit Helsinki won the championship.

Regular season

Playoffs

Quarterfinals
 Tappara - Blues 3:0 (3:1, 5:2, 3:1)
 HPK - Ilves 3:0 (4:1, 6:1, 5:1)
 Jokerit - Kärpät 3:1 (6:2, 3:5, 3:0, 5:1)
 TPS - Pelicans 3:1 (4:1, 4:5 P, 3:2 P, 2:0)

Semifinals
 HPK - Jokerit 1:3 (4:3, 2:3, 2:3 P, 0:1)
 Tappara - TPS 3:0 (3:1, 3:1, 2:1 P)

3rd place
 HPK - TPS 3:1 (

Final
 Tappara - Jokerit 1:3 (5:4, 1:3, 2:3, 1:2)

External links
 SM-liiga official website

1
Finnish
Liiga seasons